Retro Threesome is a 1998 Russian romantic drama film directed by Pyotr Todorovsky.

Plot 
The film tells about a stylish and modern woman who is drawn into the past and she begins to take photos in retro style. But faced with a serious problem, she turns into flint.

Cast 
 Elena Yakovleva as Rita
 Sergey Makovetsky as Sergey
 Evgeniy Sidikhin as Kostya
 E. Boginskaja
 Elvira Bolgova
 Ekaterina Dvigubskaya as Zina
 Vladimir Episkoposyan	
 Tatjana Ivtschenko
 Yuri Kolokolnikov
 A. Konev

References

External links 
 

1998 films
1990s Russian-language films
Russian romantic drama films
1998 romantic drama films